, better known by his pen name  , is a Japanese playwright and screenwriter.

Biography
He was born in Tokyo on 21 December 1934. He attended Azabu High School and studied aesthetics at Tokyo University. He then found work at Nippon Broadcasting System (NBS). While an employee there, he also began submitting scripts for NBS radio programs under the pen name Sō Kuramoto, keeping his identity a secret from his employers. In 1963 he left NBS and began working as a freelancer. He had troubles around NHK's teleplay Katsu Kaishū and escaped to Hokkaido. After staying in Sapporo, he moved to Furano in 1977. In 1984 he established Furano Juku, a school for script-writers and actors.

Works

Television
Katsu Kaishū (1974)
Zenryaku Ofukurosama (1975)
Daitokai Season1 (1976)
Haguregumo (1978)
  (1981–2002)
Yasuragi no Sato (2018-19)
Yasuragi no Toki Michi (2019-20)

Film
Kunoichi ninpō (1964)
Kunoichi Keshō (1964)
Blue Christmas (1978)
Fuyu no Hana (1978)
Station (1981)
Tokei – Adieu l'hiver (1986)

See also
Kuniko Mukoda
Taichi Yamada

References

1934 births
Living people
Japanese screenwriters
University of Tokyo alumni